The 1951 Denver Pioneers football team was an American football team that represented the University of Denver as a member of the Skyline Conference during the 1951 college football season. In their fourth season under head coach Johnny Baker, the Pioneers compiled a 6–4 record (4–3 against conference opponents), finished third in the conference, and outscored opponents by a total of 283 to 133.

Schedule

References

Denver
Denver Pioneers football seasons
Denver Pioneers football